The Bugul Noz ( "Night Shepherd" or "child of the night") is a nocturnal fairy or bogeyman-like being in Breton folklore, from Morbihan, Brittany.

Description 
Sources commonly describe it as a little man, goblin or kobold. Émilie Carpentier described the Bugul-Noz as a little man with claws, fiery eyes, and a whistling voice, who threatened shepherds and workers who linger outside after dark. In one story, the "bugul noz" rides at night, although he turns back at the sight of crossroads to avoid the shape of the cross. If he takes a person prisoner, he will drown them as soon as the cock crows.

Another source described it as an undead spirit.

Anatole Le Braz, a professor of French Literature, heard of the Bugul-Noz as a tall, foreboding figure who appears at twilight. One informant suggested that rather than a threatening figure, the Bugul-Noz was a benevolent spirit influencing people not to linger outside where it wasn't safe after dark. The Bugul-Noz was compared to Yann-An-Od.

References 

Breton legendary creatures
French folklore
Fairies
Bogeymen